Magi: The Labyrinth of Magic is a Japanese anime television series based on the manga series of the same title written and illustrated by Shinobu Ohtaka. Produced by A-1 Pictures, it began airing in Japan on October 7, 2012. It also debuted in North America on October 10 on Crunchyroll and Hulu. The series is licensed by Aniplex of America in North America, by Viz Media Europe in Europe and by Madman Entertainment in Australia. From episodes 1-12, the opening theme song is "V.I.P." by SID and the ending theme song is "Yubi Bōenkyō" by Nogizaka46. From episode 13 onwards, the opening song is "Matataku Hoshi no Shita de" by Porno Graffitti and the ending is "The Bravery" by Supercell.


Episode list

References

2012 Japanese television seasons